Alien Seed  is a 1989  American  science fiction film written and directed  by Bob James and starring Erik Estrada. It was released by action International

Plot 

An Earth woman, Mary Jordan,  is abducted by an alien presence on Earth . Unable to remember what happened, and with a strange mark on her neck, she contacts writer Mark Timmons, a self proclaimed expert on alien abductions, but she is killed by Dr Stone before they meet

The dead woman's sister, Lisa, is then abducted and impregnated by the aliens, as part of the alien's scheme to create a "Messiah" to rule Earth. She calls the writer in an attempt to stop the alien's plan  MJ-12, a secret government agency studying UFOs, wants to kidnap Mary and control the child for its own purposes. Dr. Stone (Erik Estrada), however,  wants the child dead at any cost.

Cast 
 
 Erik Estrada as Dr. Stone 
  Heidi Paine as  Lisa Jordan
  Steven Blade as  Mark Timmons 
  Shellie Block as  Mary Jordan 
 David Hayes  as Rev. Bolam 
 Terry Phillips as Gen. Dole 
 Steve Gellman 	 as Maj. Wilson 
 Ben Mardel 	 as Dr. Gabriel

Reception

In Creature Feature, John Stanley gave the film two out of five stars opining that it does not rise above its direct to video origins. The Video Vacuum praised Estrada's acting, but stated the film lagged when he was not on screen. Den of Geek praised the trailer for the film as "one of the finest trailers I've seen". The Psychotronic Video Guide gave the film a poor review finding it to have a bad script, poor special effects, and too many chase scenes.

Home Release

Released on DVD in 1999  Available to stream

References

External links 

1980s science fiction films
American science fiction films
1980s English-language films
1980s American films